is a Japanese voice actress from Ibaraki Prefecture. She is affiliated with Haikyō.

Filmography

Television animation
2010
 Robin-kun to 100-nin Otomodachi Series 2 as Phillip
2012
 From the New World as Child (eps 1-2)
 Kuromajo-san ga Toru!! as Daigorō Iwata
 La storia della Arcana Famiglia as Jolly (child)
 Say "I love you". as Female student (ep 7); Woman (ep 3)
 Sword Art Online as Gin (eps 11-12)
 The Knight in the Area as Mina Nakae
 The Pet Girl of Sakurasou as, TV: Woman (ep 4)
2013
 A Certain Scientific Railgun S as Researcher C (ep 13); Staff Member E (ep 7)
 D.C. III: Da Capo III
 Dog & Scissors as Reporter (ep 1)
 Golden Time as Underclassman Club Member 2 (ep 8)
 High School DxD New as Magician (ep 11)
 Kotoura-san as Child (ep 8); Woman (ep 11)
 Little Busters! as Tarō
 Love Live! School Idol Project as Mathematics Teacher (ep 2), Friend A (ep 4)
 Strike the Blood as Caster (ep 3); Possessed Mask (ep 10)
 Tanken Driland - 1000-nen no Mahō - as Wolf Spirit Rhean (ep 4)
 Futari wa Milky Holmes as Female Teacher (eps 3, 9)
 The Devil Is a Part-Timer! as Operator A (ep 2)
 The Eccentric Family as Nakai B
2014
 Aldnoah.Zero as Female soldier
 Argevollen as Female soldier (ep 3)
 Atelier Escha & Logy: Alchemists of the Dusk Sky as Micie Sun Mussemburg
 Celestial Method as Teacher (ep 3)
 Invaders of the Rokujyōma!? as Takahashi (ep 3)
 Is the Order a Rabbit? as Female Customer (ep 10)
 Nagi-Asu: A Lull in the Sea as Sayu's mother
 Nanana's Buried Treasure as Yumi Hino (ep 6)
 Oreca Battle as Fire Orega
 Selector Spread WIXOSS (2014) as Manager (ep 6)
 Strike the Blood as Female Attendant (ep 15)
 World Trigger as Yūma Kuga
 Your Lie in April as Judge (ep 2)
2015
 Aquarion Logos as Announcement
 Chivalry of a Failed Knight as Boy (ep 3); Stella's mother (ep 1)
 Comet Lucifer as Lilian Anatolia, Black Guardian (ep 10, 12)
 Diabolik Lovers More, Blood as Ruki (young)
 Food Wars! Shokugeki no Soma as Megumi's mother (eps 3-4, 20-22)
 Gangsta. as Emilio (young), Arthur (ep 10)
 Ghost in the Shell: Arise Alternative Architecture as Amuri (ep 4); operator A (eps 5-6)
 Gintama° as Izumi's Brother (ep 278)
 Haikyū!! Second Season as Kei Tsukishima (young)
 Heavy Object as Lady (ep 3); Trainer (ep 4)
 High School DXD BorN as Queen (ep 8)
 Lance N' Masques as Boy (ep 11)
 Lupin the Third (2015) as Reporter (ep 6)
 Maria the Virgin Witch as Clansman (ep 8)
 Mobile Suit Gundam: Iron-Blooded Orphans as Akihiro Altland (young)
 Tantei Kageki Milky Holmes TD as Officer A; Nicholas
 The Heroic Legend of Arslan as Fake Tahamine (ep 6)
 The Idolmaster Cinderella Girls as Aki Yamato (ep 5)
 The Idolmaster Cinderella Girls 2nd Season as Aki Yamato (ep 25)
 Transformers: Robots in Disguise as Russell Clay
 Your Lie in April as Nurse (ep 21)
2016
 Active Raid as Female clerk A
 BBK/BRNK as Sōya Arabashiri (child)
 The File of Young Kindaichi Returns Season 2 as Ayame Kagehira (eps 38-41)
 Future Card Buddyfight Triple D as Bal
 Gate: Jieitai Kano Chi nite, Kaku Tatakaeri Season 2 as Fen (ep 17)
 Luck & Logic as Headquarters staff A (ep 11)
 Lupin the Third (2015) as Yoshio Watson Ōbayashi (ep 21)
 Digimon Universe: Appli Monsters as Bootmon (ep 43)
2017
 Kirakira PreCure a la Mode as Aoi Tategami/Cure Gelato
2018
 FLCL Progressive as Gorō Mori
 Hugtto! PreCure as Aoi Tategami/Cure Gelato (eps 36-37)
That Time I got Reincarnated as a Slime as Greater Spirit of Light (episode 23, OAD episodes 3 & 5)
2019
 Case Closed as Kaori Kanno (ep 936)
2020
 Magia Record, Akira Shinobu (Ep.6)
 Japan Sinks: 2020, Gō Mutō
2021
 World Trigger 2nd Season as Yūma Kuga
 World Trigger 3rd Season as Yūma Kuga
2022
 Boruto: Naruto Next Generations as Harika Aburame (ep 261)

Original video animation (OVA)
2014
 Ghost in the Shell: Arise (2014), Amuri (ep 1); Opeko A (ep 2)

Original net animation (ONA)
2014
 Sailor Moon Crystal as Housewife (ep 3)

Theatrical animation
2015
 Sinbad: Sora Tobu Hime to Himitsu no Shima as Sinbad
 Go! Princess PreCure The Movie: Go! Go!! Splendid Triple Feature!!! as Kin
2017
 Kirakira PreCure a la Mode: Crispy! The Mille-feuille of Memories! as Aoi Tategami/Cure Gelato
2018
 PreCure Super Stars! as Aoi Tategami/Cure Gelato
 Hugtto! PreCure Futari wa Pretty Cure: All Stars Memories as Aoi Tategami/Cure Gelato
 Mobile Suit Gundam Narrative as Michelle Luio
2019
 PreCure Miracle Universe as Aoi Tategami/Cure Gelato

Video games
2008
 Lord of Vermilion as Baba Yaga, Shizuka Gozen
2013
 Atelier Escha & Logy: Alchemists of the Dusk Sky as Micie Sun Mussemburg
 Conception II: Children of the Seven Stars as Aquatics Captain
 The Wonderful 101 as Alice MacGregor
2014
 Robot Girls Z Online as Glossam X2; Horuzon V3
2015
 The Idolmaster Cinderella Girls as Aki Yamato
2017
 Magia Record as Akira Shinobu
2019
 One Piece: World Seeker as Roule
2021
 Resident Evil Village as Daniela Dimitrescu
 Arknights as Wild Mane

Drama CD
 Angels Candies (Evil)
 Robot Girls Z BD/DVD Vol.1 Drama CD (2014), Glossam X2

Dubbing

Live-action
The 5th Wave as Ringer (Maika Monroe)
Alita: Battle Angel as Koyomi K. (Lana Condor)
The Batman as Bella Reál (Jayme Lawson)
Big Game as Oskari (Onni Tommila)
Birds of Prey as Dinah Lance / Black Canary (Jurnee Smollett-Bell)
Brain Games as Marsai Martin
Cruella as Anita "Tattletale" Darling (Kirby Howell-Baptiste)
The Day Shall Come as Kendra Glack (Anna Kendrick)
Decision to Leave as Yeon-su (Kim Shin-young)
Earth to Echo as Alex Nichols (Teo Halm)
Fifty Shades Darker as Mia Grey (Rita Ora)
Fifty Shades Freed as Mia Gray (Rita Ora)
The Flash as Iris West (Candice Patton)
Obi-Wan Kenobi as Reva Sevander / Third Sister (Moses Ingram)
Ocean's 8 as Nine Ball (Rihanna)
The Ridiculous 6 as Smoking Fox (Julia Jones)
SEAL Team as Lisa Davis (Toni Trucks)
Shooter as Nadine Memphis (Cynthia Addai-Robinson)
Vigil as Kirsten Longacre (Rose Leslie)
Westworld as Charlotte Hale (Tessa Thompson)
WandaVision as Monica Rambeau (Teyonah Parris)
Zhong Kui: Snow Girl and the Dark Crystal as Zhong Ling (Yang Zishan)

Animation
 Glitch Techs as Miko Kubota
 The Powerpuff Girls as Buttercup

References

External links
 Official blog 
 Agency profile 
 

1989 births
Living people
Voice actresses from Ibaraki Prefecture
Japanese voice actresses
21st-century Japanese actresses
Tokyo Actor's Consumer's Cooperative Society voice actors